Lost Memoirs and Faded Pictures is the debut album by the metalcore band Symphony In Peril. It was released on 14 November 2003.

Track listing 

"Shadow Over a Bleeding Heart" - 3:41
"Letting Go Would Be An End" - 4:03
"The Quotidian Succession" - 3:47
"Sifting Through These Ashes" - 5:03
"Beauty Forgotten" - 1:13
"Lament" - 3:06
"Unsteady Docks Along the Ohio" - 3:12
"Portrait" - 3:23
"Three Months" - 1:20
"Can One Possess Autumn?" - 18:22
"Hidden Track" - 0:36

Personnel
SIP
Shawn Jonas - vocals
Andy Reale - guitar
Joshua Aronovsky - guitar 
Collin Simula - bass
Shawn Seippel - drums

Production
 Doug White - producer, engineering, mixing, mastering
 Caleb Olsen - layout, design

References

2003 albums
Symphony in Peril albums
Facedown Records albums